Chartoff is a surname. Notable people with the surname include: 

Melanie Chartoff (born 1948), American actress and comedian
Robert Chartoff (1933–2015), American film producer and philanthropist